is a Japanese voice actress who is affiliated with the Arts Vision management company. She's originally from the Metropolitan Tokyo Area.  Her maiden name is ..

Filmography

Anime Series
Shima Shima Tora no Shimajirō (1993) – Kotarō
Wild Arms: Twilight Venom (1999) – Missile
Crush Gear Turbo (2001) – Wang Hu
Monkey Typhoon (2002) – Yū
Ki Fighter Taerang (2002) – Taerang
Beyblade (2002) – Net
Crush Gear Nitro (2003) – Rasuka
Konjiki no Gash Bell!! (2003) – Nicole
Shutsugeki! Machine Robo Rescue (2003) – Taiyō Ōzora
Onmyō Taisenki (2004) – Byakko no Kogenta
MAJOR (2004) – Murai
.hack//Roots (2006) – Tri-Edge
Naruto (2006) – Isaribi

Original video animation (OVA)

Mazinkaiser (2001) – Shiro Kabuto
Mazinkaiser vs Great Darkness General (2003) – Shiro Kabuto
.hack//GIFT (2003) – Kite
.hack//Unison (2003) – Kite
Ajisai no Uta (2004) – Gon-chan

Anime Films
Mobile Suit Zeta Gundam: A New Translation (2005) – Shinta

Video games

Power Stone (1999) – Wang Tang
Power Stone 2 (2000) – Wang Tang
.hack//INFECTION (2002) – Kite
.hack//MUTATION (2002) – Kite
.hack//OUTBREAK (2002) – Kite
Shinobi (2002) – Akagane
.hack//QUARANTINE (2003) – Kite
Summon Night Craft Sword Monogatari: Hajimari no Ishi (2005) – Ritchburn
.hack//G.U. Volume 1: Rebirth (2006) – Tri-Edge
The Legend of Zelda: Twilight Princess (2006)
.hack//G.U. Volume 2: Reminisce (2006) – Azure Kite
I/O (2006) – Enlil
.hack//G.U. Volume 3: Redemption (2007) – Azure Kite
Project X Zone (2012) – Kite
Project X Zone 2 (2015) – Kite
 The Legend of Zelda: Breath of the Wild (2017)

Tokusatsu
Kyuukyuu Sentai GoGo-V (2000) – Analyse Robo Mint
Bakuryuu Sentai Abaranger (2003) – Burstosaur Bachycelonagurus
Bakuryū Sentai Abaranger DELUXE: Abare Summer is Freezing Cold! (2003; film) – Burstosaur Bachycelonagurus
Bakuryū Sentai Abaranger vs. Hurricaneger (2004) – Burstosaur Bachycelonagurus

CDs
Onmyō Taisenki Special Soundtrack Tiger Volume – Byakko no Kogenta
Onmyō Taisenki Special Soundtrack 2 Dragon Volume – Byakko no Kogenta

Dubbing

Live-action
Amélie – Young Amélie (Flora Guiet)
Eddie the Eagle – Janette Edwards (Jo Hartley)
Emma – Miss Bates (Miranda Hart)
Spanglish – Cristina (Shelbie Bruce)
Temptation of Wolves – Lee Bo-jung (Lee Ji-hee)
Vacation – Debbie Griswold (Christina Applegate)
West Side Story – Fausta (Andréa Burns)

Animation
Curious George – Maggie

References

External links
 
 
 Sayaka Aida at GamePlaza-Haruka Voice Acting Database 
 Sayaka Aida at Hitoshi Doi's Seiyuu Database

1975 births
Living people
Japanese video game actresses
Japanese voice actresses
Voice actresses from Tokyo Metropolis
20th-century Japanese actresses
21st-century Japanese actresses
Arts Vision voice actors